Ivan Glebovich Sokolov  (Ivan Glebovič Sokolov; August 29, 1960) is a Russian-born composer and pianist, currently living in Germany.

He is a member of the Russian-German Composers Quartet with Sokolov and Alexei Aigui from Moscow and Dietmar Bonnen and Manfred Niehaus from Cologne.

External links
 at the classicalarchives.com
Sokolov's page at obst-music
Ivan Sokolov at the Moscow Conservatory

Russian composers
Russian male composers
Russian classical pianists
Male classical pianists
1960 births
Living people
21st-century classical pianists
21st-century Russian male musicians